Mr Love: Queen's Choice is a Chinese otome visual novel mobile game that allows players to text, chat and call the male leads while developing the player's own career as a media producer.

The game takes place in a fantasy setting. The protagonist is an unnamed heroine who gets involved with 4 male characters with superpowers. The game allows players to choose their romance path and experience mystery and conflict in a deep story spanning dozens of episodes.

The game was first released in Mainland China on December 14, 2017. It was later released on March 20, 2019 on Google Play in the UK and two months later in other English-speaking territories.

An anime television series adaptation by MAPPA aired from July 15 to September 30, 2020.

The success of the game has caused commenters in both Chinese and international media to note that women preferred the game to dating real men despite the gender imbalance in China following the government's one-child policy, which has resulted in more boys being born than girls.

On June 4, 2021, it was announced that Papergames had cut ties with voice actor Jonah Scott after making a statement that "Taiwan is a country" on Twitter. In response, other voice actors Sean Chiplock and Joe Zieja have also stepped down from the game. On June 7, 2021, the game's different social media accounts had announced that the characters voiced by Scott, Chiplock, and Zieja were going to appear in the upcoming English chapters without voices included, confirming all three had their voice acting removed from the game.

Characters

Main

Others

Background

Red Queen Hypothesis 
'In this world, it takes all the running you can do to keep in the same place...'

In the cruel natural selection, species must evolve faster than others to gain a favorable position in the biological chain.

Those who believe in the Red Queen hypothesis insist that humans should actively seek changes in order to rule nature.

Evol 
"Evol" ('love' backwards) is a special ability that only appears in very few people. In other words, a superpower. 

Those who with Evol are "Evolvers", super-evolved humans.

Advanced evolutionary genes have made Evolvers transcend humans.

Black Swan Project 
The Black Swan Project, also known as the Perfect Human Genetic Transform Program, is a plan to find ways to reform humans by studying Evol genes.

Through this plan, normal humans can become Evolvers, which is an opportunity to change the world.

Black Swan Queen 
The Black Swan Queen is the most special of all evolvers.

The Queen's genes can awaken and strengthen the ability of others, which is a key factor in launching the Black Swan program.

Features

Phone System 
This aspect allows the player to keep in touch with the love interests through messages, calls and social media. The player can interact with them through messenger apps and calls, as well as commenting on their online posts.

Messages and moments are unlocked when the player obtains certain karma cards, progress through the main story, and by increasing intimacy levels. Communicating with the love interests through the phone feature allows the player to increase the Intimacy level of each character.

Company System 
The player runs their own production studio in the game. The player will need to hire employees, produce TV programs, and deal with emergencies. 

Employees are called "Experts" and each come with specific traits necessary to pass levels. Experts can be obtained by completing the storyline or in the "City News" shop.

Main Story 
The world of Mr. Love is full of mysterious superpowers. Here the player will experience a unique combination of fantasy and romance. As the story unfolds, the player will unravel the mysterious secrets about the character's and their own identities through dozens of episodes, a deep plot, and a passionate romance simulation.

Karma System 
Karma are cards that the player obtains and uses in the main levels of the game. They have ultra HD pictures and CG. Karma can have one of eight rankings: N, NH, R, ER, SR, SSR, SER, and SP.

Anime adaptation 
An anime television series adaptation was announced on July 8, 2019. The series is directed by Munehisa Sakai at studio MAPPA, with Kiyoko Yoshimura and Jinshichi Yamaguchi behind the scriptwriting and characters design respectively. Emoto Entertainment is producing the series. The main cast members reprised their roles for the anime. It aired from July 15 to September 30, 2020 on Tokyo MX and other channels. The opening theme song, "Nibiiro no Yoake" (Dark Gray Dawn), was performed by Yutaro Miura. The ending theme song, "Maioritekita Yuki" (Snow That Flies Down), was performed by Konomi Suzuki. Hu Xia's "Chen Hun" (Daybreak Dusk) and Ju Jingyi's "Mèng de Lû háng" (Dream’s Voyage) both serve as the opening and ending theme respectively for the Chinese airing of the series.

Episode list 
<onlyinclude>

References

External links 
   (in Chinese)
  
  
 
 
 
 
 

2017 video games
Anime television series based on video games
Android (operating system) games
IOS games
MAPPA
Mobile games
Otome games
Simulation video games
Video games developed in China